Gillman may refer to:

People
Gillman (surname)

Other
 Gillman, South Australia, a suburb of Adelaide
 Gill-man, a fictional creature from the 1954 film Creature from the Black Lagoon and sequels
 Gillman Barracks, former army base in Singapore.

See also
 Gillman v. Holmes County School District, a court decision regarding gay rights
 Gilman (disambiguation)